Serine protease 23 is an enzyme that in humans is encoded by the PRSS23 gene.

This gene encodes a member of the trypsin family of serine proteases. Mouse studies found a decrease of mRNA levels after ovulation was induced. This gene seems to be highly conserved in vertebrates and may be an important ovarian protease.

References

Further reading